The weekly journal Hikmet (Ottoman-Turkish: حکمت; DMG: Ḥikmet; English: "Wisdom"), published in Istanbul from 1910 to 1911, was one of the first sufistic journals that were founded during the Second Constitutional Period.
It was published by Şehbenderzâde Filibeli Ahmed Hilmi (1865-1914), a Turkish Sufi, author and thinker.
The journal had the subtitle “Unity is life and dissension is death“ („İttihad hayattır, tefrika memattır“).
Two volumes with a total of 79 issues were published and covered political, economic and social topics as well as articles on philosophy, islamic mysticism and sufistic literature.
Hilmi's criticism of the “Committee of Unity and Progress” (İttihat ve Terakki Cemiyeti) ultimately led to the suspension of the journal Hikmet.
In addition to Hikmet Hilmi also published the journals Çaylak, İttihat-ı İslam and Coşkun Kalender.

References

Further reading
 Stephane A. Dudoignon et al.: Intellectuals in the Modern Islamic World: Transmission, Transformation and Communication, New York 2006.
 Adeeb Khalid: The Politics of Muslim Cultural Reform: Jadidism in Central Asia, Los Angeles 1998.
 A. Koçak: Bir Balkan Muhaciri: Filibeli Ahmed Hilmi Ve ‘Hikmet’ Gazetesinde Balkanlar, Filibeli Ahmed Hilmi And Balkans In The Newspaper Of “Hikmet, In: Motif Akademi Halk Bilimi Dergisi (Motif Academy Folklare Journal), 2012.
 Ahmet Şeyhun: Islamist Thinkers in the Late Ottoman Empire and Early Turkish Republic, Leiden 2014.

External links
 Online-Version: Ḥikmet 
 Digital Collections: Arabische, persische und osmanisch-türkische Periodika

1910 establishments in the Ottoman Empire
1911 disestablishments in the Ottoman Empire
Defunct magazines published in Turkey
Magazines about spirituality
Magazines established in 1910
Magazines disestablished in 1911
Magazines published in Istanbul
Turkish-language magazines